Bloodfist V: Human Target is a 1994 American action film directed by Jeff Yonis and starring Don Wilson, Denice Duff and Steve James. It was written by Rob Kerchner and Jeff Yonis. James succumbed to pancreatic cancer shortly before the movie's release.

External links

1994 films
1990s action films
American action films
American martial arts films
1990s English-language films
Kickboxing films
Direct-to-video sequel films
American sequel films
1994 martial arts films
Bloodfist films
1990s American films